Silver is a masculine given name which can also be used as a male or female nickname.

People named Silver include:
Silver Donald Cameron (1937–2020), Canadian journalist
Silver Ezeikpe (born 1971), Nigerian athlete
Silver Eensaar (born 1978), Estonian racer
Silver Flint (1855–1892), American baseball player
Silver Horn (1860–1940), Kiowa artist
Silver Kayemba, Ugandan military officer
Silver King (baseball) (1868–1938), American baseball player
Silver King (wrestler) (1968–2019), Mexican wrestler and actor
Silver Koulouris (born 1947), Greek musician
Silver Leppik (born 1983), Estonian basketball player
Silver Maar (born 1999), Estonian volleyball player
Silver Meikar (born 1978), Estonian politician, human rights activist and journalist
Silver (cartoonist) (born 1952), real name Guido Silvestri, Italian cartoonist
Silver Pozzoli (born 1953), Italian singer
Silver Quilty (1891–1976), Canadian football player
Silver RavenWolf (born 1956), American neopaganist author and lecturer
Silver Sonntak (born 1976), Estonian rower
Silver Sphere (born 1999), American singer-songwriter
Silver Tree (born 1977), American film producer
Silver X (born 1988), South Sundanese musical artist

See also
Elmer Zacher (1880–1944), American baseball player nicknamed "Silver"
Silver Surfer, comic book character

References

Masculine given names
Estonian masculine given names